"German Whip" is the debut single by grime artist Meridian Dan, released as the lead single from his forthcoming debut album, I Am London. The song features vocals from rappers Big H and JME, and was produced by The HeavyTrackerz, who have been credited with production for many other chart-successful songs. The song entered the UK Singles Chart on 20 May 2014 at number 13, which remains its highest charting position.

Background and release
The song was released on 13 April 2014, having achieved nationwide recognition beforehand. The song was added to BBC Radio 1Xtra's A-list and received support from BBC Radio 1, Kiss FM and Capital Radio.

The song is a panegyric on the subject of driving high-quality German precision engineered motor cars with blacked out windows whilst leaning back. The phrase "whip" was used after various rappers noticed that the Mercedes-Benz logo resembled a steering wheel, which used to be called a whip.

Music video
The song has two music videos. The first was released in 2013, directed by Jay Parpworth and produced by SB.TV, gaining 10.4 million views and was shown nationwide via all major TV channels such as MTV and The Box. The second was released six months later and was produced by Vevo, and features an array of German cars.

Critical reception
Critical reception has been positive to mixed. Swarve Men Magazine called the song "awesomely catchy". Robert Foster of Bankholidaycomes.com said the song was a "little nugget of grime fun". In addition, Stagedoor.fm said that heaven would be "hot weather, coupled with the windows down, plus [the Skepta, Professor Green, Bossman Birdie & Rizzle Kicks] remix". However, Robin Murray of Clashmusic.com commended Meridian Dan's "untamed vocal", but dismissed the beat as "ridiculous". Complex magazine ranked the song second on their list of "Grime's Most Impatcful Songs of the 2010s", calling it an "anthem to kickstart the [grime] buzz - most importantly bringing grime back to commercial daytime radio".

Legacy
The song has been credited with steering grime's unexpected comeback. In addition, T-shirt Party created a T-shirt in homage to the song, which contains Audi, BMW, Mercedes-Benz, Porsche and Volkswagen logos.

Track listing

References

2014 debut singles
2014 songs
Virgin EMI Records singles
Universal Music Group singles
Jme (musician) songs